The 2010–11 Israel State Cup (Gvia HaMedina) was the 72nd season of Israel's nationwide football cup competition and the 57th after the Israeli Declaration of Independence. It began on 3 September 2010, while the final was held in Ramat Gan Stadium on 25 May 2011.

The competition was won by Hapoel Tel Aviv, who had beaten Maccabi Haifa in the final.

By winning, Hapoel Tel Aviv qualified for the 2011–12 UEFA Europa League, entering in the third qualifying round.

Calendar

Results

Seventh Round
The 16 winners from the previous round of the competition join the 16 Liga Leumit clubs in this stage of the competition. These matches were played on 4 January 2011.

Eighth Round
The 16 winners from the previous round of the competition join the 16 clubs from the Israeli Premier League in this stage of the competition. These matches were played on 1–2 February 2011.

Round of 16 to the Final
Games were played from March 1 to May 25, 2011.

Round of 16
The 16 winners of the previous round entered this stage of the competition. These matches took place on 1–2 March 2011.

Quarter-finals
The draw took place on 3 March 2011. The 8 winners of the previous round entered this stage of the competition. These matches took place on 19–20 April 2011.

Semi-finals
The draw took place on 26 April 2011. The 4 winners of the previous round entered this stage of the competition. These matches toke place on 11 May 2011 in Ramat Gan Stadium.

Final

References

External links
 Israel Football Association website 

Israel State Cup
State Cup
Israel State Cup seasons